Phyllomacromia a large genus of dragonflies in the family Macromiidae. They are commonly known as cruisers.

The genus contains the following species:

References

Macromiidae
Anisoptera genera
Taxa named by Edmond de Sélys Longchamps
Taxonomy articles created by Polbot